The Ji-Paraná River (Machado River), sometimes spelled Jiparaná, is a river in Rondônia state in western Brazil. It is a tributary of the Madeira River in the Amazon Basin. For much of its length it runs roughly parallel with the northeastern state border of Rondônia. The city of Ji-Paraná is divided by the river.

Part of the river's basin is covered by the  Jacundá National Forest, a sustainable use conservation unit.
Part of the basin is in the  Jaru Biological Reserve, a fully protected conservation unit created in 1984.
The river forms the southern boundary in Rondônia of the Campos Amazônicos National Park, a  protected area created in 2006 that holds an unusual enclave of cerrado vegetation in the Amazon rainforest.

See also
List of rivers of Rondônia

References
Brazilian Ministry of Transport

River
Rivers of Rondônia